Levandi is an Estonian surname. Notable people with the surname include:

Allar Levandi (born 1965), Estonian Nordic combined skier
Anna Levandi (born 1965), Russian figure skater
Arlet Levandi (born 2005), Estonian figure skater

Estonian-language surnames